Andoque–Urequena is a language family that consists of a pair of languages, Andoque and Urequena. The close relationship of Urequena to Andoque was first recognized by Marcelo Jolkesky.

Urequena (Uerequena, Arequena, Orelhudos) is currently extinct, and is known only from an undated 19-century manuscript by Austrian naturalist Johann Natterer. Natterer gives the Içá River (or Putumayo River) as the location of the Urequena language.

References

 
Language families
Indigenous languages of the Americas
Languages of Colombia